This list of Scottish Gaelic surnames shows Scottish Gaelic surnames beside their English language equivalent.

 Unlike English surnames (but in the same way as Slavic, Lithuanian and Latvian surnames), all of these have male and female forms depending on the bearer, e.g. all Mac- names become Nic- if the person is female.
 Some of the Scottish Gaelic surnames are Gaelicised forms of English surnames; and conversely, some of the English surnames are Anglicised forms of the Gaelic surnames.
 In some cases the Gaelic and English names do not share an etymological origin.
 Several surnames have multiple spellings; this is sometimes due to unrelated families bearing the same surname.
 A single surname in either language may have multiple translations in the other.
 In some English translations of the names, the M(a)c- prefix may be omitted in the English, e.g. Bain vs MacBain, Cowan vs MacCowan, Ritchie vs MacRitchie. Also, the prefixes Mac- and Mc- are interchangeable, although individuals may have a preference as to which form is used in their own surname.

Surname list
Note that certain names may appear multiple times on this list; use the 'find' or 'search' function in your web browser to quickly look up certain names.

A-C

D-M

Mac-
Mac- (son of) is by far the most common element in Scottish Gaelic surnames.

Mao-U

See also
List of Scottish Gaelic given names
Scottish surnames

Notes

References

Footnotes

Print references

  (Proper names - appendix)

 
Scottish Gaelic surnames